Christian Meidell Kahrs (24 September 1858 – 12 July 1924) was a Norwegian businessperson and politician for the Liberal Party and later the Coalition Party.

He was born in Bergen. He graduated from Bergen Cathedral School in 1877, and took the cand.jur. degree in 1881. In 1882 he was hired as a clerk for the district stipendiary magistrate in Hallingdal. Already the next year he returned to Bergen to work as a merchant. He was also the CEO of the bank Bergens Sparebank.

He was a member of Bergen city council in 1893 to 1910, serving as mayor from 1899 to 1901, preceded by Christian Michelsen and followed by Johan Ludwig Mowinckel, both of whom served as Prime Minister of Norway. Kahrs was elected to the Norwegian Parliament in 1904, but only served one term.

Kahrs was a member of the board of Den Nationale Scene from 1892 to 1909, and chaired the supervising committee of the Bergen Line.

References

1858 births
1924 deaths
Norwegian businesspeople
Members of the Storting
Liberal Party (Norway) politicians
Coalition Party (Norway) politicians
Mayors of Bergen
People from Notodden
People educated at the Bergen Cathedral School